Pierre-Luc "Pete" Laforest (born January 27, 1978) is a Canadian former professional baseball catcher and was the first manager of the Trois-Rivières Aigles.

Career
Laforest is a graduate of Fort Scott Community College. He was a draft pick of the Montreal Expos, but has also played for the Tampa Bay Devil Rays, the San Diego Padres, and the Philadelphia Phillies.

In 2003, Laforest missed spring training and the first month of the season due to visa problems. Since 1997, he had improperly used a student visa to enter the United States, and in the wake of the September 11 terrorist attacks he was denied entry to the country until an FBI background check had been completed.

Laforest did not speak English until moving to the United States to attend community college, as he was raised in Quebec where the main language is French.

In winter 2007/08, Laforest played for the Mexicali Eagles in the Mexican Pacific League. In February , he signed a minor league contract with the Florida Marlins, but was released during training camp. He then signed a contract with the Rojos del Águila de Veracruz a AAA-level team in the Mexican League. In May of the same year, he joined the Capitales de Québec, an independent team in his home province of Quebec.

In 2013, he was hired as the manager of the Trois-Rivières Aigles in the Canadian American Association of Professional Baseball. Laforest was fired on July 11, 2016, and replaced by batting coach Maxime Poulin.

International career
He was part of Team Canada at the 2004 Summer Olympics and 2006 World Baseball Classic.

References

External links

1978 births
Águilas de Mexicali players
Arizona League Padres players
Baseball managers
Baseball people from Quebec
Baseball players at the 2004 Summer Olympics
Canadian expatriate baseball players in Mexico
Canadian expatriate baseball players in the United States
Caribes de Oriente players
Canadian expatriate baseball players in Venezuela
Charleston RiverDogs players
Durham Bulls players
Fort Scott Greyhounds baseball players
Gulf Coast Expos players
Gulf Coast Devil Rays players
Lehigh Valley IronPigs players
Living people
Major League Baseball catchers
Major League Baseball players from Canada
Mesa Solar Sox players
Mexican League baseball catchers
Mexican League baseball first basemen
Mexican League baseball third basemen
Minor league baseball managers
Olympic baseball players of Canada
Orlando Rays players
Portland Beavers players
Philadelphia Phillies players
Princeton Devil Rays players
Québec Capitales players
Rojos del Águila de Veracruz players
San Diego Padres players
Somerset Patriots players
Sportspeople from Gatineau
St. Petersburg Devil Rays players
Tampa Bay Devil Rays players
Tomateros de Culiacán players
Trois-Rivières Aigles players
World Baseball Classic players of Canada
2006 World Baseball Classic players